Dr. Balakrishnan is an Indian film script writer, lyricist, director and producer in Malayalam movies. He scripted story and dialogue for more than 50 movies. He has also directed and produced around 10 movies. His debut movie is Thalirukal in 1965. Renowned film director Satyan Anthikad started film career working as his assistant. He is also credited with introducing imminent film director I.V. Sasi and music director A. T. Ummer to the Malayalam film industry.

Partial filmography

Dialogue

 Thalirukal (1967)
 Kaliyalla Kalyaanam (1968)
 Ladies Hostel (1973)
 Nadeenadanmaare Aavasyamundu (1974)
 College Girl (1974)
 Ayalathe Sundari (1974)
 Madhurappathinezhu (1975)
 Love Letter (1975)
 Chandanachola (1975)
 Kalyaanappanthal (1975)
 Thaamarathoni (1975)
 Madhuram Thirumadhuram (1976)
 Sindooram (1976)
 Manassoru Mayil (1977)
 Snehayamuna (1977)
 Raajaparampara (1977)
 Jalatharangam (1978)
 Enikku Njaan Swantham (1979)
 Agnivyooham (1979)
 Sarpam (1979)
 Kaavalmaadam (1980)
 Arangum Aniyarayum (1980)
 Poochasanyaasi (1981)
 Anuraagakkodathi (1982)
 Kurukkante Kalyanam (1982)
 Beedikkunjamma (1982)
 Sindoorasandhyaykku Mounam (1982)
 Kinnaaram (1983)
 Mandanmaar Londonil (1983)
 Vikadakavi (1984)
 Thathamme Poocha Poocha (1984)
 Kaliyil Alpam Karyam (1984)
 Veruthe Oru Pinakkam (1984)
 Vepraalam (1984)
 Nayakan (1985)
 Prem Poojari (1999)

Screenplay

 Thalirukal (1967)
 Kaliyalla Kalyaanam (1968)
 Nadeenadanmaare Aavasyamundu (1974)
 College Girl (1974)
 Madhurappathinezhu (1975)
 Love Letter (1975)
 Chandanachola (1975)
 Kalyaanappanthal (1975)
 Thaamarathoni (1975)
 Madhuram Thirumadhuram (1976)
 Sindooram (1976)
 Manassoru Mayil (1977)
 Raajaparampara (1977)
 Jalatharangam (1978)
 Enikku Njaan Swantham (1979)
 Agnivyooham (1979)
 Sarpam (1979)
 Kaavalmaadam (1980)
 Arangum Aniyarayum (1980)
 Anuraagakkodathi (1982)
 Kurukkante Kalyanam (1982)
 Beedikkunjamma (1982)
 Sindoorasandhyaykku Mounam (1982)
 Kinnaaram (1983)
 Mandanmaar Londonil (1983)
 Vikadakavi (1984)
 Thathamme Poocha Poocha (1984)
 Kaliyil Alpam Karyam (1984)
 Veruthe Oru Pinakkam (1984)
 Vepraalam (1984)
 Nayakan (Vaa Kuruvi Varu Kuruvi) (1985)
 Prem Poojaari (1999)

Story

 Thalirukal (1967)
 Kaliyalla Kalyaanam (1968)
 Ladies Hostel (1973)
 Nadeenadanmaare Aavasyamundu (1974)
 College Girl (1974)
 Madhurappathinezhu (1975)
 Love Letter (1975)
 Chandanachola (1975)
 Kalyaanappanthal (1975)
 Thaamarathoni (1975)
 Madhuram Thirumadhuram (1976)
 Sindooram (1976)
 Manassoru Mayil (1977)
 Snehayamuna (1977)
 Raajaparampara (1977)
 Jalatharangam (1978)
 Enikku Njaan Swantham (1979)
 Agnivyooham (1979)
 Kaavalmaadam (1980)
 Arangum Aniyarayum (1980)
 Dantha Gopuram (1981)
 Anuraagakkodathi (1982)
 Kurukkante Kalyaanam (1982)
 Beedikkunjamma (1982)
 Sindoorasandhyaykku Mounam (1982)
 Kinnaaram (1983)
 Mandanmaar Londonil (1983)
 Vikadakavi (1984)
 Thathamme Poocha Poocha (1984)
 Kaliyil Alpam Karyam (1984)
 Veruthe Oru Pinakkam (1984)
 Nayakan  (1985)

Direction
 Love Letter (1975)
 Kalyaanappanthal (1975)
 Madhuram Thirumadhuram (1976)
 Kaadaaru Maasam (1976)
 Raajaparampara (1977)
 Evide En Prabhaatham (1979)

Production
 Ladies Hostel (1973)
 College Girl (1974)
 Love Letter (1975)
 Chandanachola (1975)

Lyrics
 Ithuvare Pennoru ... 	Kaliyalla Kalyaanam	1968	
 Maanasaveenayil ... 	Ladies Hostel	1973	
 Chandanakkuriyitta ... 	College Girl	1974	
 Kingini Ketti ... 	College Girl	1974	
 Anjanamizhikal ... 	College Girl	1974	
 Muthiyamma Pole Vannu ... 	College Girl	1974	
 Amrithaprabhaatham Virinju ... 	College Girl	1974	
 Arikathu Njammalu Bannotte ... 	College Girl	1974	
 Oru Swapna Binduvil ... 	Vrindaavanam	1974	
 Swargamandaarappookkal ... 	Vrindaavanam	1974	
 Pattudayaada ... 	Vrindaavanam	1974	
 Oru Thulli Madhu tha ... 	Vrindaavanam	1974	
 Madhuvidhu Raathri ... 	Vrindaavanam	1974	
 Bindu Neeyananda ... 	Chandanachola	1975	
 Maniyaanchettikku ... 	Chandanachola	1975	
 Bindu Neeyen Jeeva ... 	Chandanachola	1975	P Susheela	
 Manavaattippenninallo ... 	Kalyaanappanthal	1975	
 Kaashaaya Kaashellam ... 	Madhuram Thirumadhuram	1976	
 Oru Nokku Devi ... 	Madhuram Thirumadhuram	1976	
 Oh My Love My Love ... 	Madhuram Thirumadhuram	1976	
 Naduvodinjoru mollaakka ... 	Madhuram Thirumadhuram	1976
 Kaathu Kaathu ... 	Manassoru Mayil	1977	
 Hamse Sunlo ... 	Manassoru Mayil	1977	
 Maanathoraaraattam ... 	Manassoru Mayil	1977	
 Sandhye Nee Va Va Sindooram Tha Tha ... 	Snehikkan Samayamilla	1978	
 Kuttappa Njan Achanalleda ... 	Snehikkan Samayamilla	1978	
 Kaakkayennulla Vaakkinartham ... 	Jalatharangam	1978	
 Sakhi Sakhi Chumbanam ... 	Jalatharangam	1978

References

External links

Malayalam film directors
Malayalam screenwriters
Malayalam-language lyricists
Malayalam film producers
Living people
Film directors from Thiruvananthapuram
Film producers from Thiruvananthapuram
20th-century Indian dramatists and playwrights
20th-century Indian film directors
Screenwriters from Thiruvananthapuram
Year of birth missing (living people)